Atilio Rinaldi (died 1980) was an Argentine film editor. He worked on over ninety films during his career.

Selected filmography
 Savage Pampas (1945)
 Where Words Fail (1946)
 From Man to Man (1949)
 The New Bell (1950)
 The Earring (1951)
 The Voice of My City (1953)
 Love Never Dies (1955)
 The Candidate (1959)
 Closed Door (1962)

References

Bibliography
 Peter Cowie & Derek Elley. World Filmography: 1967. Fairleigh Dickinson University Press, 1977.

External links

Year of birth unknown
Year of death unknown
Argentine film editors